Siobhan Marsden is a fictional character from the British ITV soap opera, Emmerdale, played by Abigail Fisher. She made her first appearance on 10 March 2003, before departing the following year on 7 September 2004.

Development
Siobhan was introduced in March 2003 alongside the Marsden family. In September 2003, the serial's producer Steve Frost announced that he would be writing out the majority of the family. Frost told an Evening Standard journalist that "the Marsdens have got a great story to play through the autumn, but unfortunately this culminates in them leaving the village." However, he confirmed that Siobhan and her on-screen husband Paul Marsden (Matthew Booth) would remain in the series. Frost told a reporter from Inside Soap that "Paul and Siobhan Marsden will be staying and facing some trying times".

Writers originally portrayed Siobhan and Paul as having a happy marriage but altered this via a pregnancy storyline. When Siobhan becomes pregnant, she and Paul agree that she should have an abortion. Writers developed the story with Siobhan struggling with their decision and Paul's attitude towards her decision to work whilst pregnant leaves her confused. Paul later changes his mind and want to keep the baby, but Siobhan does not. She confides in Louise Appleton (Emily Symons) that she intends to fake a miscarriage. Siobhan has a termination but lies to Paul that she is still pregnant and decided against terminating her pregnancy.

Storylines
After arriving in town, Siobhan soon found a job as a nurse, although she repeatedly clashed with locals, most notably when Victoria Sugden (Hannah Midgley) faked an illness. When Victoria actually became sick, Siobhan didn't believe her, causing a clash with Jack Sugden (Clive Hornby). When Paul's family left the village in December 2003, the couple moved into Victoria Cottage.

In July 2004, married life ended in a horrific manner. Siobhan's husband, Paul went to fix the gutters on a roof with Carl King (Tom Lister). Carl playfully tossed him some tools, but when Paul tried to catch them, he fell to his death. Carl and Paul had only recently made up after a fight, and Carl was terrified people would think he'd deliberately killed Paul. Carl called his brothers Jimmy King (Nick Miles) and Matthew King (Matt Healy) and they moved Paul's body to his garden. After returning home from the pub with best mate Chloe Atkinson (Amy Nuttall), Siobhan found Paul's body, cradling him in her arms. Siobhan had no desire to stay in the village, and Matthew, happy to get rid of her as soon as possible, bought Victoria Cottage. Days before her departure, Siobhan learned she was pregnant—a bittersweet irony, as Paul had wanted nothing more than to be a father. Siobhan considered staying in the village, but Matthew refused to let her rent. She left a few days later, never knowing the true circumstances of her husband's death.

Reception
Lorna Cooper of MSN TV listed Siobhan of one of Soap Opera's "forgotten characters" and noted that during her time in the serial she managed to clash with all of the locals. Justine O'Mahony from the Enniscorthy Guardian was not impressed with Siobhan's pregnancy storyline and abortion lie. She branded it "sick" and "even sicker" when Siobhan celebrates her pregnancy following the abortion. Mahony, now writing for Wexford People branded her "the awful Siobhan" for feigning a miscarriage.

References

Emmerdale characters
Television characters introduced in 2003
Female characters in television
Fictional nurses